Exchange Building may refer to:
 Australia
 Exchange Building, Toowoomba, a heritage-listed building in Queensland
 England
 Exchange Building, a Corn exchange building were grain is traded
 Malta
 Exchange Buildings, an alternate name for La Borsa in Valletta
 United States
 Exchange Building (Memphis), Tennessee
 Exchange Building (Newark, Delaware)
 Exchange Building (Kansas City, Missouri), listed on the NRHP in Jackson County, Missouri
 Exchange Building (San Antonio), Texas
 Exchange Building (Petersburg, Virginia)
 Exchange Building (Seattle), Washington

See also
 Exchange Bank Building (disambiguation)
 Exchange Tower, Toronto, Ontario